The 621st Contingency Response Wing (621 CRW) is a United States Air Force rapid response expeditionary wing, based out of Joint Base McGuire-Dix-Lakehurst, New Jersey and Travis Air Force Base, California highly-specialized in training and rapidly deploying personnel globally to quickly open airfields and establish, expand, sustain, and coordinate air mobility operations during a variety of contingency operations.

The 621st consists of approximately 1500 airmen in six groups, fourteen squadrons and more than 20 geographically separated operating locations aligned with major Army and Marine Corps combat units. Four Contingency Response Groups (817th, 818th, 570th and 571st CRGs) provide the core cadre of expeditionary command and control, airlift and air refueling operations and aircraft maintenance personnel for deployment worldwide as mobility control teams and airfield assessment teams. These teams rapidly survey, assess and establish contingency air bases and expand existing Air Mobility Command support infrastructure worldwide.

Mission
The 621st CRW is highly specialized in training and rapidly deploying personnel to quickly open airfields and establish, expand, sustain, and coordinate air mobility operations. From wartime taskings to disaster relief, the 621st extends Air Mobility Command's (AMC) reach in deploying people and equipment around the globe.

Most of the operations can be classified by three types: Joint Task Force - Port Opening (JTF-PO), where USAF and US Army units create distribution chains; Expeditionary Air Mobility Support, (EAMS) where CRW personnel augment existing forces for the mission; and Initial Airbase Opening (IAO). Other operations include: Air Advisory with partner nations, augmenting or stand alone Command and Control (C2), and Air Advisory of airlift assets for U.S. Army and Marine Units.

History

The 621st was established on 24 June 1994 as the 621st Air Mobility Operations Group before being activated on 22 July of that year at McGuire Air Force Base (part of Joint Base McGuire–Dix–Lakehurst since 2009). It was expanded into the 621st Contingency Response Wing on 1 March 2005. The 621st included four groups, eight squadrons and ten geographically separated operating locations aligned with major US Army and Marine Corps combat units. The wing maintains a ready corps of light, lean and agile mobility support forces able to respond as directed by the 18th Air Force at Scott Air Force Base, Ill., in order to meet Combatant Command wartime and humanitarian requirements. Following the 2010 Haiti earthquake of 12 January, the 817th Contingency Response Group deployed to Toussaint L'Ouverture International Airport, Port-au-Prince, Haiti in support of Operation Unified Response. Before the earthquake, Toussaint L'Ouverture handled an average of 20 flights a day. Immediately following the earthquake this number jumped dramatically. At its peak on 19 January, more than 160 aircraft landed and were safely unloaded by the CRW—an 800 percent increase in air traffic from pre-disaster levels.

In early 2010, Airmen from the 571st Contingency Response Group and 819th Global Support Squadron deployed to Camp Marmal, Mazar-i-Sharif, Afghanistan to provide aerial cargo handling support for the Operation Enduring Freedom logistics surge. The 816th Contingency Response Group was inactivated on 11 June 2010. In August 2010, 30 Airmen from the 818th Contingency Response Group deployed as a Contingency Response Element, or CRE, to Chaklala Airbase, Pakistan. Once deployed, they provided additional aerial port capabilities to increase aircraft loading efficiency for the Pakistan Air Force's Central Flood Relief Cell.

Airmen from the 621st Contingency Response Group deployed thrice in support of Operation Inherent Resolve. In 2015, they deployed to Iraq where it established an airstrip at al-Taqaddum to support coalition forces in the Battle for Ramadi. In 2016, the group established the Kobani airfield in Syria and also set up an airfield at Qayarrah West in Iraq to support coalition forces in the Battle of Mosul. In November 2016 Airman from the group with a contingent of civil engineers, intelligence personnel and security forces were temporarily deployed to expand and modify the airstrip that the Airmen had established at an air base where they deployed to near Kobani, so it can be used effectively to assist in the offensive to retake Raqqa from ISIS. The airbase gives the US an additional location for its aircraft to support U.S. and other anti-ISIS forces, but it had been used by US forces limitedly due to the condition of the runway which restricted what types of aircraft could land there. General Carlton Everhart II, commander of US Air Mobility Command, said that the base enables aircraft to deliver critical supplies, equipment and help position forces, he added that airmen from the 621st group have supported anti-ISIS coalition forces on the ground in Syria.

In early 2021, the 621st was involved in the closure of numerous air fields and bases within Afghanistan as part of the withdrawal of US troops from Afghanistan. On August 18, 2021, the Pentagon announced the deployment of the 621st back into Afghanistan to support evacuation operations following the collapse of the Afghan government.

Operations for NASA
With a separation of over 1,000 miles, teams from the 621st remained ready to launch at a moment's notice in support of the Space Shuttle launches during the years of the program (1981-2011).

Designed to provide a quick response mobility force, the 621st CRW's shuttle support mission was only to be executed in the event of a post launch emergency that forced the shuttle to land at an alternate location. CRW Airmen sat on-call during the schedule launch to facilitate the response in case the shuttle mission was aborted.

Lineage 
Constituted as the 621st Air Mobility Operations Group on 24 June 1994
Activated on 22 July 1994
Redesignated the 621st Contingency Response Wing on 1 March 2005

Assignments
Twenty-First Air Force (later, 21st Expeditionary Mobility Task Force), 22 July 1994
United States Air Force Expeditionary Center (USAF EC), 19 March 2012 – present

Components
621st Air Mobility Advisory Group (621 AMAG) 
321st Air Mobility Operations Squadron (321 AMOS)
621st Air Mobility Operations Squadron (621 AMOS)
571st Mobility Support Advisory Squadron (571 MSAS)
621st Mobility Support Operations Squadron (621 MSOS)
818th Mobility Support Advisory Squadron (818 MSAS) - "By order of the Secretary of the Air Force, the 818th Mobility Support Advisory Squadron will provide air mobility advisory and training assistance in support of the Air Force goals of building partner capacity (April 19, 2011)."

621st Contingency Response Group (621 CRG) 
321st Contingency Response Squadron (321 CRS)
621st Contingency Response Squadron (621 CRS)
621st Contingency Response Support Squadron (621 CRSS)

821st Contingency Response Group (821 CRG) 
821st Contingency Response Squadron (821 CRS)
821st Contingency Response Support Squadron (821 CRSS)
921st Contingency Response Squadron (921 CRS)

Stations
McGuire Air Force Base (later, part of Joint Base McGuire-Dix-Lakehurst), New Jersey, 22 July 1994
Travis Air Force Base, California, 29 May 2012

References

External links
621st Contingency Response Wing Fact Sheet
621 CRW Official Site

Military units and formations in New Jersey
0621